Streptomyces niveiscabiei is a streptomycete bacterium species known to cause potato common scab disease in Korea. Its type strain is S78T (=LMG 21392T =KACC 20254T). It has  white, smooth, cylindrical spores that are borne in simple rectus flexuous spore-chains.

References

Further reading

Khodakaramian, Gholam, Doost Morad Afari, and Pari Mohammad Javad Soleimani. "Diversity of streptomyces strains causing potato scab disease in Hamedan province and their thaxtomin production potential." Applied Entomology and Phytopathology (2011).

External links
LPSN

niveiscabiei
Bacteria described in 2003